Kouakou Thierry Mathias Kassi (born 1 March 2000) is an Ivorian footballer who currently plays as a forward for AS Tanda

Career statistics

International

References

2000 births
Living people
Ivorian footballers
Ivory Coast international footballers
Association football forwards
Academie de Foot Amadou Diallo players
AS Tanda players
Issia Wazy players
Ligue 1 (Ivory Coast) players